PDO Handball Team Salerno, also known as Jomi Salerno due to sponsorship reasons, is a women's handball club from Salerno in Italia. Jomi Salerno competes in the Serie A.

Honours 

 Serie A
 Winners (8) : 2010, 2011, 2013, 2014, 2017, 2018, 2019, 2021

 Coppa Italia
 Winners (6) : 2009, 2012, 2013, 2014, 2019, 2020

 Supercoppe Italiane
 Winners (5) :  2012, 2013, 2018, 2019, 2021

European record

Team

Current squad 

Squad for the 2018–19 season

Goalkeepers
 1  Elisa Ferrari
 19  Antonella Valentina

Wingers
RW
 5  Roberta Motta
 20  Laure Oliveri
 25  Laura Casale
LW 
 2  Rita Trombetta
 3  Carmela Stellato
 18  Giuseppa Napoletano
Line Players 
 6  Erika De Somma
 9  Antonella Coppola

Back players
LB
 4  Ilaria Dalla Costa
 8  Serena Santoro
 11  Giuliani Fabbo
CB 
 33  Valentina Landri 
 77  Martina de Santis
RB
 10  Suleiky Gómez
 24  Cyrielle Lauretti Matos

External links

 
 EHF Club profile

Italian handball clubs
Salerno